Dennis Allen Patera (born October 17, 1945) is a former American football placekicker who played one season with the San Francisco 49ers of the National Football League (NFL). He was drafted by the 49ers in the seventeenth round of the 1968 NFL Draft. He first enrolled at Columbia Basin College before transferring to Brigham Young University. Patera attended Cleveland High School in Portland, Oregon.

Early years
Patera was a two-year letterman in football and a three-year letterman in track and field at Cleveland High School. He earned All-PIL Honorable Mention honors in football. He was also the PIL Discus Champion and State Meet Discus Champion in track. Patera was inducted into the PIL Hall of Fame in 2011.

College career
Patera initially attended Columbia Basin College. He transferred to Brigham Young University and was a letterman in football and track for the BYU Cougars. He set school records in football for most points scored and longest field goal with a 53 yarder. Patera was also 2nd place in WAC Discus in track.

Professional career
Patera was selected by the San Francisco 49ers of the NFL with the 449th pick in the 1968 NFL Draft. He played in five games for the team during the 1968 season.

Personal life
Patera is the brother of professional wrestler Ken Patera and American football player and coach Jack Patera.

References

External links
Just Sports Stats

Living people
1945 births
Players of American football from Portland, Oregon
Track and field athletes from Portland, Oregon
American football placekickers
Cleveland High School (Portland, Oregon) alumni
Columbia Basin Hawks football players
BYU Cougars football players
BYU Cougars men's track and field athletes
American male discus throwers
San Francisco 49ers players